Emmanuel Kabeya Mudiay (born March 5, 1996) is a Congolese-American professional basketball player for the Iowa Wolves of the NBA G League. He played high school basketball for Grace Preparatory Academy and Prime Prep Academy in Texas, where he gained much of the media's attention. He committed to play for the SMU Mustangs men's basketball team on August 24, 2013, but later made the decision to forgo college and joined the Guangdong Southern Tigers in China. After an injury-riddled season in China, he was selected with the seventh overall pick in the 2015 NBA draft by the Denver Nuggets.

Early life
Mudiay was born on March 5, 1996, in Kinshasa, Zaire (now the Democratic Republic of the Congo) to Jean-Paul Mudiay and Therese Kabeya. His father died when he was a toddler, and the family was tremendously troubled by the Second Congo War. He lived under the constant threat of the instability in the region, while his mother grew only enough coffee and vegetables to support their needs. In 2001, Kabeya and her sons sought asylum in the United States and eventually escaped. He primarily spoke French upon arriving in the United States, but his older brother said, "We felt like Americans."

High school career
In his freshman season, Mudiay attended Grace Preparatory Academy in Arlington, Texas, where he played alongside Isaiah Austin, who became an elite college center before being diagnosed with Marfan syndrome. Mudiay scored 16 points in the 2011 TAPPS Class 4A Final, helping the team defeat two-time champions Westbury Christian School with the score of 42-37.

Mudiay transferred to Prime Prep Academy in Dallas, Texas, with head coach Ray Forsett for his final seasons in high school. The program was put under scrutiny following the ineligibility of Karviar Sheperd and Jordan Mickey, two elite collegiate prospects. Upon excellent seasons with Prime Prep, however, Mudiay was rated the second-best recruit in his class by Rivals.com. He was also touted as a possible number one pick in the 2015 NBA draft.

He committed to play for the SMU Mustangs men's basketball team on August 24, 2013, because of the prospect of being coached by Larry Brown, who previously won an NBA title with the Detroit Pistons. Mudiay selected the school over other possibilities with the likes of Arizona, Baylor, Kansas, and Kentucky.

In the summer of 2014, Mudiay made the decision to forgo college and play overseas after considering playing in the Chinese Basketball Association. The move drew comparisons with Brandon Jennings, who made a similar choice.

Professional career

Guangdong Southern Tigers (2014–2015)
On July 22, 2014, Mudiay signed a one-year, $1.2 million contract with the Guangdong Southern Tigers of the Chinese Basketball Association. On December 5, 2014, Will Bynum was signed by Guangdong as an injury replacement for Mudiay. Mudiay managed just 10 regular season games for Guangdong, only returning to action for the team on March 1, 2015, in Game 3 of their semi-final series against the Beijing Ducks. He played in Game 4 as well, but Guangdong lost the best-of-five series 3–1. In 12 total games (10 regular season and two playoff), Mudiay averaged 18.0 points, 6.3 rebounds, 5.9 assists, and 1.6 steals per game.

Denver Nuggets (2015–2018)
On June 25, 2015, Mudiay was selected by the Denver Nuggets with the seventh overall pick in the 2015 NBA draft. Mudiay played with the Nuggets in the 2015 NBA Summer League in Las Vegas, where he was named to the All-NBA Summer League second team. On July 31, he signed a 2-year, $6.3 million rookie scale contract with the Nuggets. He made his debut for the Nuggets in the team's season opener against the Houston Rockets on October 28, recording 17 points and nine assists in a 105–85 win. Mudiay started in all 23 games for the Nuggets to begin the season before a sprained right ankle suffered on December 11 ruled him out for 14 straight games. He returned to action on January 10 against the Charlotte Hornets, recording 11 points and six assists in a 95–92 win. On February 11, he was selected to replace injured defending champion Patrick Beverley in the NBA All-Star Weekend Skills Challenge. On March 10, he scored a career-high 30 points in a 116–98 win over the Phoenix Suns. On March 23, he recorded 27 points and 11 rebounds, and hit the game-winning 35-foot "rainbow" shot at the buzzer to give the Nuggets a 104–103 win over the Philadelphia 76ers. At the season's end, he earned NBA All-Rookie Second Team honors.

On November 6, 2016, Mudiay scored 24 of his career-high-tying 30 points in the first quarter of the Nuggets' 123–107 win over the Boston Celtics. On January 16, 2017, he had a career-high 13 assists in a 125–112 win over the Orlando Magic. Mudiay made 41 starts over the first half of the 2016–17 season before being moved to the bench and dropping out of the rotation in late January.

New York Knicks (2018–2019)
On February 8, 2018, Mudiay was acquired by the New York Knicks in exchange for Doug McDermott and a second-round pick, as part of a three-team trade with the Nuggets and the Dallas Mavericks. In his debut for the Knicks three days later, Mudiay had 14 points and 10 assists in a 121–113 loss to the Indiana Pacers.

Two days prior to the start of the 2018–19 season, Mudiay sprained his right ankle in practice; an injury which would sideline him for over two weeks. On December 14, he scored a career-high 34 points in a 126–124 overtime win over the Charlotte Hornets. On January 25, he was diagnosed with a left shoulder strain and was ruled out for at least two weeks. He returned from a 12-game absence on February 22 against the Minnesota Timberwolves. Mudiay missed the final two games of the season because of a sore left shoulder.

Utah Jazz (2019–2020)
On July 20, 2019, Mudiay signed with the Utah Jazz. In an interview shortly after signing with the Jazz he was asked specifically why he chose to sign with the Jazz organization and he stated that he "can look at him [Mike Conley] like a big brother and he can mentor me" and "a lot of players that have come here have developed and gotten better and that's something that I wanted to do." He also stated he had never played in the playoffs and that's something that he wanted to do.

On August 3, 2021, Mudiay was included in the roster of Portland Trail Blazers for the 2021 NBA Summer League.

Žalgiris Kaunas (2021)
On August 23, 2021, Mudiay officially signed a one-year deal with Lithuanian club Žalgiris Kaunas of the EuroLeague.

On November 2, 2021, Mudiay and Žalgiris mutually parted ways. Mudiay averaged 7.4 points, 3.2 assists and 2.2 rebounds while shooting 32.5% from the field over 5 games with the club.

Sacramento Kings (2021–2022)
On December 22, 2021, Mudiay signed a 10-day contract with the Sacramento Kings.

Iowa Wolves (2022–present)
On November 2, 2022, Mudiay was named to the opening night roster for the Iowa Wolves.

National team career
During the 2016 off-season, Mudiay was part of the USA Men's Select Team, a team selected to train with the USA Basketball Men's National Team in preparation for the 2016 Rio Summer Olympics.

Career statistics

NBA

Regular season

|-
| style="text-align:left;"|
| style="text-align:left;"|Denver
| 68 || 66 || 30.4 || .364 || .319 || .670 || 3.4 || 5.5 || 1.0 || .5 || 12.8
|-
| style="text-align:left;"|
| style="text-align:left;"|Denver
| 55 || 41 || 25.6 || .377 || .316 || .784 || 3.3 || 3.9 || .7 || .2 || 11.0
|-
| style="text-align:left;"|
| style="text-align:left;"|Denver
| 42 || 0 || 17.9 || .401 || .373 || .808 || 2.2 || 2.9 || .5 || .1 || 8.5
|-
| style="text-align:left;"|
| style="text-align:left;"|New York
| 22 || 14 || 22.4 || .368 || .196 || .686 || 2.6 || 3.9 || .9 || .3 || 8.8
|-
| style="text-align:left;"|
| style="text-align:left;"|New York
| 59 || 42 || 27.2 || .446 || .329 || .774 || 3.3 || 3.9 || .7 || .3 || 15.0
|-
| style="text-align:left;"|
| style="text-align:left;"|Utah
| 54 || 2 || 15.7 || .462 || .345 || .759 || 2.3 || 2.1 || .4 || .2 || 7.3
|-
| style="text-align:left;"|
| style="text-align:left;"|Sacramento
| 2 || 0 || 5.5 || .000 ||  || .750 || .0 || 2.0 || .5 || .0 || 1.5
|- class="sortbottom"
| style="text-align:center;" colspan="2"|Career
| 302 || 165 || 23.8 || .401 || .323 || .744 || 2.9 || 3.8 || .7 || .3 || 10.9

Playoffs

|-
| style="text-align:left;"|2020
| style="text-align:left;"|Utah
| 3 || 0 || 11.3 || .357 || .667 || .500 || 2.0 || .7 || .0 || .3 || 4.3
|- class="sortbottom"
| align="center" colspan="2"|Career
| 3 || 0 || 11.3 || .357 || .667 || .500 || 2.0 || .7 || .0 || .3 || 4.3

CBA

|-
| style="text-align:left;"|2014–15
| style="text-align:left;"|Guangdong
| 12 || 0 || 31.6 || .478 || .342 || .574 || 6.3 || 5.9 || 1.6 || .1 || 18.0

References

External links

 Emmanuel Mudiay at draftexpress.com
 Emmanuel Mudiay at espn.com

1996 births
Living people
American men's basketball players
American people of Democratic Republic of the Congo descent
Basketball players from Texas
BC Žalgiris players
Democratic Republic of the Congo men's basketball players
Democratic Republic of the Congo expatriates in China
Democratic Republic of the Congo expatriates in the United States
Denver Nuggets draft picks
Denver Nuggets players
Guangdong Southern Tigers players
Iowa Wolves players
National Basketball Association players from the Democratic Republic of the Congo
New York Knicks players
Point guards
Sacramento Kings players
Basketball players from Kinshasa
Utah Jazz players